Utricularia sect. Lecticula is a section in the genus Utricularia that was originally described as genus Lecticula in 1913 by John Hendley Barnhart. The two species in this section are small subaquatic carnivorous plants that are distinguished by the unique bracts, which are basifixed and tubular. Both species are native to North and South America.

See also 
 List of Utricularia species

References 

Utricularia
Plant sections